Pseudoligostigma is a genus of moths of the family Crambidae.

Species
Pseudoligostigma argyractalis 
Pseudoligostigma boliviensis Munroe, 1964
Pseudoligostigma enalassalis 
Pseudoligostigma enantialis 
Pseudoligostigma enareralis 
Pseudoligostigma heptopalis 
Pseudoligostigma incisa Strand, 1920
Pseudoligostigma odulphalis (Schaus, 1924)
Pseudoligostigma phaeomeralis 
Pseudoligostigma punctissimalis

References

Natural History Museum Lepidoptera genus database

Glaphyriinae
Crambidae genera